The Benicia Refinery is an oil refinery located near the San Francisco Bay Area city of Benicia, California. The refinery is owned by Valero Energy Corporation.

History
The refinery was built in 1968 for Humble Oil and completed in 1969. Humble Oil changed its name to Exxon in 1972. Valero purchased the property in 2000.

References

Oil refineries in the United States
Oil refineries in California
Benicia, California
Buildings and structures in Solano County, California
Energy infrastructure in California
Petroleum in California
Energy in the San Francisco Bay Area
1968 establishments in California
Energy infrastructure completed in 1968